Vagrinec is a village and municipality in Svidník District in the Prešov Region of north-eastern Slovakia.

History
In historical records the village was first mentioned in 1548.

Geography
The municipality lies at an altitude of 292 metres and covers an area of 5.525 km2. It has a population of about 127 people.

References

External links
 
 

Villages and municipalities in Svidník District
Šariš